Encore: Live in Concert is a live double-LP by Argent which was released in December 1974, on Epic Records PEG 33079. The performance includes the Rod Argent penned Zombies hit "Time of the Season" (1968) and the Russ Ballard penned "I Don't Believe In Miracles" which was a UK #31 hit for Colin Blunstone in 1972. Blunstone had previously been the vocalist in the Zombies with Rod Argent.

Track listing

Personnel
Argent
Rod Argent – piano, organ, keyboards, vocals
Russ Ballard – electric guitar, vocals (plus uncredited piano on "I Don't Believe in Miracles")
Jim Rodford – bass guitar, vocals
Robert Henrit – drums, percussion

References 

Argent (band) live albums
Albums produced by Rod Argent
Albums produced by Chris White (musician)
1974 live albums
Live albums recorded at the Theatre Royal, Drury Lane
Epic Records live albums